The Tennessee Riverwalk is a 13-mile (21-km) riverside path which parallels the Tennessee River from the Chickamauga Dam to downtown Chattanooga, Tennessee.  It is part of the Tennessee Riverpark System featuring the Tennessee Riverpark, Coolidge Park, Renaissance Park, Ross's Landing, the Walnut Street Bridge, the Blue Goose Hollow section and the old U.S. Pipe property.

The initial segment was opened in May 1989.

The Riverwalk is a mix of paved pathways, boardwalks, and bridges along the river, through marshland, and over creeks.  Restroom facilities and drinking fountains are conveniently spaced along the path.

Nine brightly colored quarter-inch-thick stainless steel silhouettes mark each milestone along the Riverwalk, including a bird watcher, bluegrass musician, bicyclists, a man in a wheelchair and another strolling, a jogging father and daughter, and a family group.

Currently the rules of the Tennessee Riverwalk east of the Veterans Bridge are as follows:

•Pets are allowed in the park, but must be on a leash at ALL TIMES and owners must follow all applicable state laws regarding handling the pet
•No swimming
•No camping
•No open fires
•No Alcoholic Beverages
•No Firearms without a permit
•Roller blades and bicycles will use extreme caution and will operate at reduced speeds on trails
•No loitering around parked vehicles or in parking lots

References

External links
Tennessee Riverwalk Map(pdf)
Tennessee Riverpark Page on Hamilton County's Web Site

Geography of Chattanooga, Tennessee
Hiking trails in Tennessee
Protected areas of Hamilton County, Tennessee
Tourist attractions in Chattanooga, Tennessee